

This is a timeline of Bangladeshi history, comprising important legal and territorial changes and political events in Bangladesh and its predecessor states. To read about the background to these events, see History of Bangladesh. See also the list of presidents of Bangladesh and list of prime ministers of Bangladesh, and the list of years in Bangladesh.

 Millennia: 2nd BC–1st BC1st–2nd3rd

Centuries: 16th BC15th BC14th BC13th BC12th BC11th BC10th BC9th BC8th BC7th BC6th BC5th BC4th BC3rd BC2nd BC1st BC

1st2nd3rd4th5th6th7th8th9th10th11th12th13th14th15th16th17th18th19th20th

16th century BC

15th century BC

14th century BC

13th century BC

12th century BC

11th century BC

10th century BC

9th century BC

8th century BC

7th century BC

6th century BC

5th century BC

4th century BC

3rd century BC

2nd century BC

1st century BC

1st century

2nd century

3rd century

4th century

5th century

6th century

7th century

8th century

9th century

10th century

11th century

12th century

13th century

14th century

15th century

16th century

17th century

18th century

19th century

20th century

21st century

2000s Decade

2010s Decade

See also
 List of years in Bangladesh
 Timeline of the Bangladesh Liberation War
 Timeline of Dhaka
 Timeline of the COVID-19 pandemic in Bangladesh
 List of timelines

External links
Timelines of History: Bangladesh

References

Bangladesh
Bangladesh history-related lists